"Pigeons from Hell" is a horror short story by American writer Robert E. Howard, written in late 1934 and published posthumously by Weird Tales in 1938. The title comes from an image in Howard's grandmother's ghost stories, that of a deserted plantation mansion haunted by pigeons. It was re-written and adapted by Joe R. Lansdale with art by Nathan Fox and published in four issues by Dark Horse Comics, starting in April 2008.

Plot summary
Two New Englanders, John Branner and his friend Griswell, travel in the South and spend the night in a deserted plantation manor. Griswell awakens from a dream of a yellow-faced creature looking at him. He sees Branner walk up the stairs in a trance. He is horrified when Branner returns as an animated corpse gripping the bloody axe that had split his skull. Griswell flees into the woods.

In his flight, he meets the county's sheriff, Buckner, who investigates the house and finds Branner motionless on the floor. Griswell is implicated in his friend's murder, but the sheriff gives him the benefit of the doubt and tries to clear him. Buckner gives some credence to Griswell's bizarre tale due to the manor's ominous reputation. It was the Blassenville's residence, family from the West Indies who were known for their cruelty. 

After the American Civil War, the Blassenvilles fell into poverty, with all their menfolk dead and only four sisters remaining, shortly to be joined by their aunt Celia from the West Indies and her mulatto maid Joan. Celia mistreated Joan, and when the latter disappeared, it was thought she had run away. Soon after, Celia vanished as well, and it was thought that she had returned to the West Indies. Over the next months, three of the Blassenville sisters also vanished one by one. One night in 1890, the last of the Blassenvilles, Elizabeth, fled the house, claiming she had found her sisters' corpses in a secret room and that she had been attacked by the shape of a woman with a yellow face. She left for California and never returned. The manor has lain deserted since, and the local black folk shun it. The eponymous pigeons sometimes flock about the decaying manor. Legend has it that they are the Blassenvilles' souls.

The following evening, Buckner and Griswell visit the hut of an ancient voodoo man, Jacob, seeking information about the house and the Blassenvilles. Jacob tells of the extinct family and of Celia Blassenville, who mistreated her mulatto maid Joan. He claims to be a maker of "zuvembies", but he insists he cannot talk about them to a white man without Damballah sending a snake with a white crescent moon on its head to kill him. But he drifts into senility and rambles about voodoo, the god Damballah, and about zombies and their female counterparts, zuvembies, who live only to kill and have no sense of time, possess hypnotic powers, and who can live indefinitely unless wounded by "steel or lead". Finally, he tells how "she" participated in voodoo rites and that "the other" came to Jacob for the "Black Brew" that makes a woman a zuvembie. Reaching for firewood, Jacob is bitten by a venomous snake, meeting the fate he feared. Buckner and Griswell conclude that Joan transformed herself into a zuvembie to exact vengeance on Celia Blassenville and her nieces. They resolve to spend the night in Blassenville Manor to learn the truth. There they find Elizabeth Blassenville's diary, which tells of her fear that something is in the house with her, has killed her sisters, and will kill her too.

That night, while lying awake in the darkness, Griswell hears the same whistling as the previous night, which Elizabeth's diary had also mentioned. Thinking he is fleeing the house, he finds himself climbing the manor stairs against his will. He is confronted by a female apparition with a yellow face and a knife. Griswell is powerless to resist, but Bruckner, who has followed him up the stairs, shoots the creature, which flees, mortally wounded. They track its dying noises to the secret room where they find the hanging bodies of the three missing Blassenville sisters as well as the corpse of the zuvembie, which is still dressed in a ball gown.

Bruckner recognises the face of the zuvembie from a portrait he has seen. It is Celia Blassenville. The maid Joan, in revenge, gave the Black Brew she got from Jacob to her mistress and fled. Celia Blassenville, transformed into a zuvembie, killed three of her nieces and had been living in the abandoned manor, killing anyone who entered it at night.

Bruckner says that the case can be closed by saying that a madwoman had killed Griswell's friend John Branner, since nobody will believe the truth of the matter.

Comments

"Pigeons from Hell" is one of several regional horror stories by Howard set in the Piney Woods of the ArkLaTex region of the Deep South. Other stories include "The Shadow of the Beast", "Moon of Zimbabwe", "Black Hound of Death", and "Black Canaan".

In 1983, Stephen King, writing in Danse Macabre, calls "Pigeons from Hell" to be "one of the finest horror stories of our century". Horror historian R. S. Hadji includes "Pigeons from Hell" on his list of the most frightening horror stories.

Adaptations
The story is the basis for an eponymous episode of Boris Karloff's Thriller television series, airing in June 1961. In 1988, the story was adapted into a graphic novel by Scott Hampton for Eclipse. More recently, it has been turned into a four-issue comic book mini-series and trade paperback. It was also adapted as an episode in the first season of Blues Hours Productions' revival of the Suspense radio drama.

References

External links
 
Publication history (including early draft)
 Joe R. Lansdale's Official website

1938 short stories
Ghost stories
Horror comics
Horror short stories
Short stories by Robert E. Howard
Works originally published in Weird Tales
Works by Joe R. Lansdale
Short stories published posthumously
Southern Gothic short stories